Stained Glass Windows was an early religious television program, broadcast on early Sunday evenings on the ABC Television network. The program was hosted by the Reverend Everett C. Parker.

Broadcast history
The program ran from September 26, 1948 until October 16, 1949, and was a thirty-minute show. The program:

originally ran from 6:30 to 7pm ET (September to December 1948) 
then 7:15-7:45 pm ET (January to March 1949) 
and, finally, 7:00-7:30pm ET (March to October 1949)

The program contained dramatizations, and discussions, of moral problems, and was the very first religious TV program on ABC.

See also
1948-49 United States network television schedule
1949-50 United States network television schedule
Elder Michaux (DuMont Television Network religious program, 1948)
Lamp Unto My Feet (CBS Television, 1948-1979)

References

Bibliography
Tim Brooks and Earle Marsh, The Complete Directory to Prime Time Network and Cable TV Shows

External links
Fall 1948 schedule showing Stained Glass Windows on Sundays at 5:30pm ET

American Broadcasting Company original programming
1948 American television series debuts
1949 American television series endings
American religious television series